Albert Fletcher may refer to:

 Albert Fletcher (footballer, born 1867), English footballer for England and Wolverhampton Wanderers
 Albert Fletcher (footballer, born 1898), English footballer for Brentford and West Ham
 Albert Lewis Fletcher, American prelate of the Roman Catholic Church